The Scottish cricket team toured the Netherlands on 15 June 2010. The tour consisted of a single One Day International (ODI) and an Intercontinental Cup game against the Netherlands.

Intercontinental cup match

Only ODI

2010 in cricket
2010 in Dutch sport
International cricket competitions in 2010
International cricket tours of the Netherlands
Scottish cricket tours abroad
Netherlands
Netherlands–United Kingdom relations